Rivers in Honduras is a list of the rivers in Honduras, including those it shares with neighbours. Among the most important river in Honduras is the Ulúa, which flows  through the economically important Valle de Sula. Numerous other rivers drain the interior highlands and empty north into the Caribbean Sea. The Pacific Ocean coast also receives other important rivers such as the Choluteca River, which flows through the capital, Tegucigalpa, where it wreaked havoc during the 1998 Hurricane Mitch. La Quebradona is a river located in La Ruidosa, Copán. La Comisión Permanente de Contingencias is the body which gives out alerts when rivers are in danger of overflowing.

This list is arranged by drainage basin, from east to west, with respective tributaries indented under each larger stream's name.

Caribbean Sea 

Coco River (Segovia River) borders Nicaragua.
Cruta River
Nakunta River
Mocorón River
Warunta River
 Patuca River is the largest in Honduras and the second largest in Central America.
Wampú River
Guayambre River
Guayape River
Tinto River
Talgua River
Telica River
Jalan River
Sigre River
Plátano River
Río Sico Tinto Negro (Tinto River)
Sico River
Paulaya River
Aguán River
Yaguala River (Mangulile River)
Papaloteca River
Cangrejal River
Danto River
Cuero River
Leán River
Tela River
 Ulúa River is the most important river economically.
Humuya River
Sulaco River
Blanco River
Otoro River (Río Grande de Otoro)
Río Gualcarque
Jicatuyo River
Higuito River
Chamelecón River
Motagua River
Cuyamel River

Pacific Ocean 

Choluteca River
Goascorán River forms the El Salvador - Honduras border.
Guarajambala River
Lempa River
Mocal River
Nacaome River
Petacon River
Azacualpa River
De la Sonta River
Negro River
Sumpul River
Torola River

See also
 
 List of rivers of the Americas by coastline

References

, GEOnet Names Server

Honduras
Rivers
Honduras